Robert Charles Joynt  (14 April 1856 – 19 April 1938) was an Anglican priest and author.

Joynt was born at Coolbanagher and educated at Trinity College, Dublin. He was ordained in 1881 and began his career as a curate at Darnall. He held incumbencies at St George's Sheffield, Christ Church, Gipsy Hill and Holy Trinity Redhill. He was Archdeacon of Kingston-upon-Thames from 1919 to 1931; and Chancellor of Southwark Cathedral from 1933 to 1936.

References

External links
 

1856 births
People from County Laois
Alumni of Trinity College Dublin
Archdeacons of Kingston upon Thames
1938 deaths